Lanning Square is a neighborhood in Camden, New Jersey. It is named for Samuel Laning (1828–1830), the first mayor of Camden. According to the 2000 U.S. Census, Lanning Square has a population of 3,989. The neighborhood, sometimes known as Cooper-Lanning, or Cooper Plaza-Lanning Square, is home to Cooper University Hospital and the Coriell Institute for Medical Research. A planned station called Cooper-Campbell for the proposed Glassboro–Camden Line light rail system would stop in the neighbourhood at Haddon Avenue and South 9th Street west of the North-South Freeway.

References

External links
"Delivering Camden from the Brink"

Neighborhoods in Camden, New Jersey